Svetlana Olegovna Abrosimova (born 9 July 1980) is a Russian basketball player who has played in college, the Olympics, and in professional leagues.  She most recently played for the Seattle Storm in the Women's National Basketball Association (WNBA).  She is usually called by her nickname, "Svet" or "Sveta".

Abrosimova was born in Leningrad, Russian SFSR, Soviet Union (today St. Petersburg, Russia), to Oleg and Ludmilla Abrosimov. Her father Oleg works as a welder in a shipyard and her older sister, Tatiana, was a professional ballroom dancer. While attending school she was trained for the then Soviet Olympic team. She was named the MVP of the 1996 European Basketball Championship (also known as Eurobasket), averaging 18 points, six rebounds and three assists per game. She was also a member of all-star teams that won the 1995 and 1996 European Championship.

Abrosimova was a member of the Russian national basketball team that placed sixth at the 2000 Summer Olympics and won a silver medal in the 1998 Basketball World Championship.

College
In her freshman season (1997-1998) at the University of Connecticut, Abrosimova's team went 28–2 in the regular season, losing only to Tennessee and Rutgers. The team went on to win the Big East tournament, avenging the loss to Rutgers by beating Rutgers in the tournament championship. The team won their first three NCAA games, but Abrosimova was injured in the regional final against NC State, and the team lost, ending their season.

After a standout collegiate career, which included an NCAA national collegiate title in 2000, Abrosimova was selected in the first round (seventh overall pick) by the Minnesota Lynx during the 2001 WNBA Draft despite a foot injury.  She was a 3-time Kodak first team All-American while at UConn. Svetlana was a member of the inaugural class (2006) of inductees to the University of Connecticut women's basketball "Huskies of Honor" recognition program. She was unable to attend the ceremony in 2006 to honor her. However, UConn inducted the 2001–02 team into the Huskies of Honor on 29 December 2011. Abrosimova was a graduate assistant on that team so was invited to the ceremonies. She flew in from Russia to be part of the ceremony, and the school reprised her 2006 induction, covering up the plaque with her player number(25), then unveiling it as she was introduced.

International

While still a junior in college, Abrosimova played for her native Russian Olympic team at the 2000 Summer Olympics, where her team finished sixth. She won a bronze medal at the 2008 Olympics.

Professional
Like many other WNBA players, Abrosimova has played in various professional teams and leagues during the offseason. Following the Olympics she was signed by the WNBA's Connecticut Sun for the remainder of the 2008 season.

She played for Ekaterinburg in her native Russia during the 2008–09 WNBA off-season.

Abrosimova helped the Seattle Storm win their second championship in 2010.

WNBA career statistics

Regular season

|-
| align="left" | 2001
| align="left" | Minnesota
| 26 || 23 || 32.5 || .391 || .260 || .727 || 6.7 || 2.0 || 1.6 || 0.3 || 3.3  || 13.3
|-
| align="left" | 2002
| align="left" | Minnesota
| 27 || 27 || 29.8 || .377 || .333 || .483 || 5.4 || 2.2 || 1.6 || 0.4 || 3.4 || 11.6
|-
| align="left" | 2003
| align="left" | Minnesota
| 30 || 25 || 26.4 || .393 || .305 || .704 || 4.7 || 2.7 || 1.5 || 0.4 || 3.0 || 10.6
|-
| align="left" | 2004
| align="left" | Minnesota
| 22 || 11 || 21.0 || .353 || .377 || .609 || 3.4 || 2.0 || 1.4 || 0.1 || 2.0 || 6.6 
|-
| align="left" | 2005
| align="left" | Minnesota
| 31 || 31 || 25.1 || .395 || .402 || .726 || 3.5 || 1.9 || 1.5 || 0.2 || 2.6 || 9.8
|-
| align="left" | 2006
| align="left" | Minnesota
| 34 || 2 || 21.2 || .411 || .369 || .661 || 3.1 || 1.6 || 1.0 || 0.0 || 1.8 || 7.7
|-
| align="left" | 2007
| align="left" | Minnesota
| 34 || 29 || 24.8 || .443 || .446 || .837 || 4.4 || 2.5 || 1.3 || 0.1 || 2.0 || 10.1
|-
| align="left" | 2008
| align="left" | Connecticut
| 6 || 0 || 17.8 || .306 || .167 || .833 || 3.3 || 2.0 || 1.3 || 0.0 || 1.8 || 5.7
|-
| align="left" | 2010
| align="left" | Seattle
| 34 || 1 || 20.2 || .415 || .376 || .568 || 3.1 || 2.0 || 1.2 || 0.1 || 1.8 || 7.6
|-
| style="text-align:left;background:#afe6ba;"|  2012†
| align="left" | Seattle
| 19|| 4 || 17.3 || .347 || .222 || .458 || 2.9 || 1.6 || 1.1 || 0.2 || 2.1 || 4.6
|-
| align="left" | Career
| align="left" | 10 years, 3 teams
| 263 || 153 || 24.2 || .396 || .351 || .654 || 4.1 || 2.1 || 1.3 || 0.2 || 2.4 || 9.2

Playoffs

|-
| align="left" | 2003
| align="left" | Minnesota
| 3 || 3 || 23.0 || .273 || .429 || 1.000 || 1.7 || 1.3 || 1.3 || 0.3 || 2.7 || 7.7
|-
| align="left" | 2004
| align="left" | Minnesota
| 2 || 2 || 33.5 || .348 || .250 || .500 || 4.5 || 1.5 || 0.5 || 1.0 || 1.5 || 10.0
|-
| align="left" | 2008
| align="left" | Connecticut
| 3 || 2 || 21.0 || .458 || .000 || .500 || 3.7 || 1.3 || 1.3 || 0.0 || 1.0 || 8.0
|-
| align="left" | 2010
| align="left" | Seattle
| 7 || 0 || 15.1 || .387 || .375 || .556 || 1.7 || 0.9 || 0.3 || 0.1 || 1.9 || 5.0
|-
|style="text-align:left;background:#afe6ba;"|  2012†
| align="left" | Seattle
| 2 || 0 || 3.5 || .500 || .000 || .000 || 1.5 || 0.0 || 0.0 || 0.0 || 0.0 || 1.0
|-
| align="left" | Career
| align="left" | 5 years, 3 teams
| 17 || 7 || 18.4 || .373 || .306 || .680 || 2.4 || 1.0 || 0.6 || 0.2 || 1.6 || 6.1

UConn statistics

See also
 Connecticut Huskies women's basketball
 List of Connecticut women's basketball players with 1000 points

References

External links 

Svetlana Abrosimova WNBA Player Profile
Svetlana Abrosimova WNBA stats
Svetlana Abrosimova Fan discussion group
Svetlana Abrosimova University of Connecticut player profile

1980 births
Living people
All-American college women's basketball players
Basketball players at the 2000 Summer Olympics
Basketball players at the 2008 Summer Olympics
Connecticut Sun players
Medalists at the 2008 Summer Olympics
Minnesota Lynx draft picks
Minnesota Lynx players
Olympic basketball players of Russia
Olympic bronze medalists for Russia
Olympic medalists in basketball
Russian expatriate basketball people in the United States
Russian women's basketball players
Seattle Storm players
Small forwards
Basketball players from Saint Petersburg
UConn Huskies women's basketball players